Living Anarchism: José Peirats and the Spanish Anarcho-Syndicalist Movement is a biography of Spanish anarcho-syndicalist and historian of anarchism José Peirats written by Chris Ealham and published by AK Press in 2015. It was subsequently published in Spanish as Vivir la anarquía, vivir la utopía (2016).

References

Bibliography

External links 
 

2015 non-fiction books
AK Press books
Biographies about anarchists
Spanish biographies
English-language books